The Angola waxbill (Coccopygia bocagei) is a species of estrildid finch endemic to Angola. Some taxonomists consider it to be conspecific with the swee waxbill.

References

Angolan waxbill
Endemic birds of Angola
Angola waxbill
Angola waxbill